The 2020–21 season was Blackburn Rovers' 133nd season as a professional football club and it participated in the Championship for a third consecutive season. Along with competing in the Championship, the club also participated in the FA Cup and EFL Cup. The season covered the period from 1 July 2020 to 30 June 2021.

Summer activity

June

On the 24 Rovers announced their retained list Danny Graham, Stewart Downing, Dominic Samuel, Jayson Leutwiler, Richie Smallwood & Sam Hart discussions will be held regarding their future at the club.

From the development squad Rovers took the option to extend Matthew Platt contract by 12 months until 2021, whilst Brad Lyons & Ben Paton have both been offered new contracts, Jordan Eastham has signed a contract till 2022 while Sam Burns, Dan Pike, Jalil Saadi, Sam Durrant & James Connelly have signed contracts until 2021. Luke Brennan & Flavien Enzo Boyomo have been offered professional contracts but have yet to sign. Chanka Zimba, Jack Evans & Charley Doyle will not be retained by the club.

July

On the 1 Rovers announced the signing of young attacking midfielder Tyrhys Dolan from Preston North End on a 2-year deal following his release. Rovers also announced young winger Luke Brennan has signed his 1st professional deal, a 2-year contract until 2022, Also midfield duo Brad Lyons & Ben Paton signed 1 year deals until 2021.

On the 7 Forest Green Rovers announced the signing of Jack Evans following his release from Rovers.

On the 24 Rovers announced Danny Graham, Dominic Samuel, Jayson Leutwiler, Richie Smallwood & Sam Hart will not be offered new contracts by the club, Discussions continue to be held with Stewart Downing about extending his stay with Rovers.

On the 28 Rovers announced u23 midfielder Tom White had joined Bolton Wanderers on loan until the end of the season.

On the 29 Rovers announced u23 defender Matthew Platt had joined Barrow on a permanent deal for an undisclosed fee.

August

On the 11 Hull City announced the signing of Richie Smallwood following his release from Rovers.

On the 12 Atlético Albacete announced the signing of Flavien Enzo Boyomo after he rejected a new contract from Rovers.

On the 16 Rovers confirmed their agreement with official principal sponsor 10bet had ended 2 years into a 3-year deal.

On the 17 Rovers announced an extension to their partnership with Totally Wicked.

On the 26 Rovers announced the signing of Belgium goalkeeper Thomas Kaminski from Gent for an undisclosed fee, on a 2-year deal with the option of a further 12 months.

On the 28 Rovers announced Watson Ramsbottom Solicitors will remain our back-of-shirt sponsor for a third successive season.

On the 29 Rovers announced a new multi year shirt sponsor with leading performance and recovery compression wear brand Recoverite Compression, The new deal will see the Recoverite Compression brand on the front of all first team, Under-23s, youth and replica kits.

September

On the 2 Rovers announced the signing of young striker Connor McBride from Celtic on a free transfer, he signed a 2-year deal with the option of a further 12 months. Also Stalybridge Celtic announced the signing of Charley Doyle following his release from Rovers.

On the 4 Cardiff City announced the signing of Chanka Zimba following his release from Rovers.

On the 7 Sunderland announced the signing of Danny Graham following his release from Rovers.

On the 11 Fleetwood Town announced the signing of Jayson Leutwiler following his release from Rovers.

On the 15 Rovers announced the signing of defender Daniel Ayala following his release from Middlesbrough on a 3-year deal until 2023.

On the 21 Gillingham announced the signing of Dominic Samuel following his release from Rovers.

On the 28 Rovers announced the signing of young goalkeeper Felix Goddard following his release from Manchester City on a 2-year scholarship.

October

On the 6 Rovers announced u23 midfielder Stefan Mols had joined Intercity on loan until the end of the season. Also Rovers announced the signing of Greek u21 goalkeeper Antonis Stergiakis from Slavia Sofia on a 3-year deal until 2023 with the option of a further 12 months.

On the 16 Rovers announced the signing of defender Barry Douglas on loan from Leeds United until the end of the season, Rovers also announced the signing of midfielder Tom Trybull on loan from Norwich City until the end of the season, Rovers also announced defender Charlie Mulgrew had joined Fleetwood Town on loan until the end of the season, Rovers also announced the signing of goalkeeper Aynsley Pears from Middlesbrough for an undisclosed fee on a 4-year deal until 2024, Rovers also announced goalkeeper Andy Fisher had joined Milton Keynes Dons on a permanent deal, Rovers also announced the signing of Harvey Elliott on loan from Liverpool until the end of the season.

November

On the 2 Rovers announced midfielder Stewart Downing had rejoined the club.

On the 9 Rovers announced defender Tyler Magloire had joined Hartlepool United on loan until 9 January.

On the 11 Southend United announced the signing of Sam Hart following his release from Rovers.

On the 13 Rovers announced winger Luke Brennan had joined AFC Fylde on loan until the end of the season.

Winter activity

December

On the 23 Rovers announced attacking midfielder Bradley Dack had signed new 2 and half year deal until 2023, with the option of a further 12 months.

On the 31 Rovers announced winger Harry Chapman had joined Shrewsbury Town on loan until the end of the season.

January

On the 6 Rovers announced midfielder Brad Lyons had joined Morecambe on loan until the end of the season, Also defender Hayden Carter joined Burton Albion on loan until the end of the season.

On the 12 Rovers announced goalkeeper Joe Hilton had joined Fleetwood Town on an emergency 7 day loan.

On the 13 Rovers announced midfielder Luke Brennan had been recalled from his loan at AFC Fylde.

On the 14 Rovers announced the signing of defender Jarrad Branthwaite on loan from Everton until the end of the season.

On the 15 Rovers announced young midfielder Joe Nolan had signed a professional contract until 2022 following a successful trial.

On the 22 Rovers announced midfielder Stefan Mols had returned from his loan spell at Intercity.

On the 27 Rovers announced goalkeeper Joe Hilton had signed a new contract until 2022 & joined Ross County until the end of the season.

February

On the 1 Rovers announced the signing of defender Harry Pickering from Crewe Alexandra for an undisclosed fee, on a 4 and half year deal until 2025, he will remain on loan until the end of the season, Rovers also announced defender Joe Grayson had joined Oxford United on loan until the end of the season, Rovers also announced defender Taylor Harwood-Bellis had joined on loan from Manchester City until the end of the season, Rovers also announced forward Jack Vale had joined Rochdale on loan until the end of the season.

On the 2 Rovers announced midfielder Tom White had returned from his loan spell at Bolton Wanderers, Rovers also announced defender Tyler Magloire had joined Motherwell on loan until the end of the season.

On the 5 Rovers announced midfielder Tom White had joined Hartlepool United on a short-term loan deal.

On the 15 Rovers announced midfielder John Buckley signed a new long-term deal until 2024, with the option of a further 12 months.

On the 16 Rovers announced midfielder Tyrhys Dolan signed a new long-term deal until 2024, with the option of a further 12 months.

March

On the 4 Rovers announced defender Derrick Williams had left the club by mutual consent to join LA Galaxy.

April

May

On the 7 Rovers announced their end of season award winners Thomas Kaminski was voted Player of the Season, Harvey Elliott's goal against Millwall was voted Goal of the Season, Adam Armstrong was voted Player's Player of the Year & Junior Rovers Player of the Year & Tyrhys Dolan was named this season's PFA Club Community Champion.

Squad information

Pre-season
On 14 August Rovers confirmed their pre-season scheduled.

Competitions

Championship

League table

Results summary

Results by matchday

Matchday
The 2020–21 season fixtures were released on 21 August.

FA Cup

The third round draw was made on 30 November, with Premier League and EFL Championship clubs all entering the competition.

EFL Cup

The first round draw was made on 18 August, live on Sky Sports, by Paul Merson. The draw for both the second and third round were confirmed on September 6, live on Sky Sports by Phil Babb.

Backroom staff

Squad statistics

Appearances and goals

|-
|colspan="14"|Players out on loan:

|-
|colspan="14"|Players that played for Blackburn Rovers this season that have left the club:

|}

Goalscorers

Transfers

Summer

Transfers in

Total outgoing: +/- ~£

Transfers out

Total incoming: +/- ~£ 0

Loans in

Loans out

Winter

Transfers in

Total outgoing: +/- ~£

Transfers out

Total incoming: +/- ~£ 0

Loans in

Loans out

References

Blackburn Rovers F.C. seasons
Blackburn Rovers